Chuny Bermúdez (born 1 March 1970) is a Spanish sailor. He competed in the Star event at the 2004 Summer Olympics.

References

External links
 

1970 births
Living people
Spanish male sailors (sport)
Olympic sailors of Spain
Sailors at the 2004 Summer Olympics – Star
Place of birth missing (living people)